The National Institutes of Technology (NITs) are a group of engineering colleges in India comprising thirty-one autonomous institution located in one each major state/territory of India.

 List of Motilal Nehru National Institute of Technology, Allahabad alumni
List of National Institute of Technology Raipur alumni
 List of Maulana Azad National Institute of Technology, Bhopal alumni
 List of National Institute of Technology Calicut alumni
 List of National Institute of Technology, Hamirpur alumni
 List of National Institute of Technology, Jamshedpur alumni
 List of National Institute of Technology Kurukshetra alumni
 List of Visvesvaraya National Institute of Technology alumni
 List of National Institute of Technology, Patna alumni
 List of National Institute of Technology Rourkela alumni
 List of National Institute of Technology, Srinagar alumni
 List of Sardar Vallabhbhai National Institute of Technology, Surat alumni
 List of National Institute of Technology Karnataka alumni
 List of National Institute of Technology, Tiruchirappalli alumni
 List of National Institute of Technology, Tiruchirappalli alumni
 List of National Institute of Technology, Warangal alumni

NIT alumni